Cynthia Ann Birdsong (born December 15, 1939) is a retired American singer who became famous as a member of The Supremes in 1967, when she replaced co-founding member Florence Ballard. Birdsong had previously been a member of Patti LaBelle & The Bluebells.

Biography

Early life
Birdsong was born in Mount Holly, New Jersey on December 15, 1939, to parents Lloyd Birdsong, Sr. and Annie Birdsong. After living in Philadelphia for a duration of her childhood, the family returned to New Jersey, settling in Camden. Birdsong set her sights on becoming a nurse and attending college in Pennsylvania. When Cindy returned to Philadelphia she was contacted by a longtime friend, Patsy Holt, in 1960 to replace Sundray Tucker in Holt's singing group The Ordettes. At twenty years of age, Birdsong was the oldest member of the group with the remainder of the group still in their mid-teens.

Patti LaBelle and The Bluebells
In 1961, after a year performing in jubilees, sock hops and school functions, the Ordettes, then managed by respected music manager Bernard Montague, who later managed several other Philadelphia-based groups such as The Stylistics and The Delfonics, got their first deal with Harold Robinson's Newtown Records. Robinson almost rejected the group due to him not being initially impressed with the look of Patsy Holt — until she and the group sang to him during an audition, which prompted Robinson to change his mind. Robinson signed the group but changed the name of the group to The Bluebells (a name taken from a Newtown subsidiary, Blue Belle Records) and insisted Holt adopt a stage name, Patti LaBelle. The group had their first hit with "I Sold My Heart to the Junkman" in 1962 though Patti LaBelle wrote in her memoirs that the song was actually recorded by The Starlets. When the controversy over the song wound down, the group found a hit with the ballad, "Down the Aisle (The Wedding Song)". Birdsong was noted for her high soprano vocals in the background.

From 1963 until 1966, The Blue Belles, later known as Patti LaBelle and The Bluebells, found relative success on the charts and were raved for their live performances. After first performing at the Apollo Theater in 1961, the group became regular headliners at the world-famous venue, earning the nickname, The Sweethearts of the Apollo. Following the success of "Down the Aisle", the group had follow-up success with "You'll Never Walk Alone" and "Danny Boy" before leaving their second label, Cameo-Parkway, for a more lucrative deal with Atlantic Records. 

Cindy Birdsong first met The Supremes when The Bluebells opened for them in 1963, and again when the two groups travelled together throughout 1965–1966. Patti LaBelle has noted that a rivalry between the two groups developed after The Supremes were seen in the same store LaBelle and her band members were shopping for clothes for performances. Group members reportedly were angry when The Supremes showed up on stage wearing the same outfit that they wore. The group also befriended a fellow Motown alumnus and Philly native, Tammi Terrell during that same period. The Bluebells had some success after joining Atlantic in 1965, recording two relatively successful albums, 1966's Over the Rainbow and 1967's Dreamer scoring modest charted singles such as "All or Nothing", "Take Me a Little While" and "I'm Still Waiting".

Starting in mid and late 1966, Birdsong began to appear as a stand-in vocalist for Supremes founder Florence Ballard when Ballard's bout with alcoholism and depression caused her to miss important gigs. In 1967, Birdsong abruptly left The Bluebells to join Diana Ross and The Supremes as Ballard's official replacement. Birdsong said that the remaining Bluebells were angry with her for not telling them about joining The Supremes and refused to talk to her for years. Later, after the group changed their name to Labelle and moved into funk and rock music, they recorded member Nona Hendryx's composition, "(Can I Speak To You Before You Go To) Hollywood", which was allegedly based on the story of Birdsong's departure. Birdsong and lead singer Patti LaBelle repaired their friendship in the early 1980s after Birdsong appeared at one of LaBelle's sold-out, standing-room-only concerts. In 1999, Birdsong and the other Bluebells received a Pioneer Award from the R&B Foundation and were honored by Lauryn Hill.

Diana Ross & The Supremes (1967–1970)

For her first two and a half years as a Supreme, listeners did not hear Birdsong's voice on most of The Supremes' newest singles. Except for featured backgrounds on several collaborations with The Temptations, live album tracks, and some studio LP tracks, Birdsong and fellow member Mary Wilson did not sing backing vocals on the group's later singles. Session singers The Andantes substituted for Mary and Cindy on many, although not on all, cuts in subsequent Diana Ross & The Supremes albums.  Both the Let the Sunshine In album and the Cream of the Crop album include tracks on which Florence Ballard, Mary Wilson and Cindy Birdsong sing back-up, often in tandem with the Andantes. However, Cindy can be heard doing a brief solo during "Let the Sunshine In" on their Farewell performance.

Post Diana Ross: The "new" Supremes (1970–1972; 1973–1976)
In 1970, Jean Terrell replaced Diana Ross as lead singer of The Supremes. In the new group, both Mary and Cindy's voices were heard more prominently, including the three albums the group recorded with the Four Tops.  The same year, Birdsong married Charles Hewlett. Birdsong continued to perform with the Supremes when she became pregnant with her son, David, Birdsong officially leaving The Supremes in April 1972, after completing the Floy Joy album's recording sessions.

Her replacement, Lynda Laurence, who is Sundray Tucker's sister, had already joined Mary Wilson and Jean Terrell onstage and on the Floy Joy album cover, as Birdsong's pregnancy became visible. After a brief hiatus, Birdsong returned to The Supremes in November 1973, replacing a pregnant Laurence and remaining with The Supremes until she retired in February 1976, frustrated with her dealings with Mary Wilson's then-husband Pedro Ferrer, who was serving as the group's manager; coincidentally, a few days before Birdsong's official departure, Florence Ballard died of cardiac arrest at the age of 32 while experiencing a financial and personal recovery. During that period, Birdsong contributed to two albums: The Supremes (1975) and High Energy (1976). During this timeframe, Cindy recorded lead vocals on a version of "High Energy", however her version could not be found until the alternate take with her vocals surfaced on a 1970s Supremes CD compilation years later. Although Birdsong is vocally present on the entire High Energy album, her replacement Susaye Greene, whose voice is only heard on the title song as well as "I'm Gonna Let My Heart Do The Walking", appears on the album cover.

Later career

In June 1977, Mary Wilson performed a "farewell" concert with The Supremes (by then Scherrie Payne and Susaye Greene) and thereafter embarked on a solo career. Later that fall, Wilson was forced to play several Supremes dates, most notably in the country of Chile, that Payne and Greene would not fulfill on such short notice. Rather than risk lawsuits, Wilson recruited Birdsong and Debbie Sharpe as her backups.  

After leaving The Supremes, Birdsong worked as a nurse at UCLA Medical Center   under her married name of Cindy Hewlett, and then went to work for Suzanne de Passe at Motown Records. 

In 1983, Birdsong joined fellow former Supremes Mary Wilson and Diana Ross in a one-off reunion on the Motown 25 anniversary television special. 

In 1986, she was an original member of the Former Ladies of the Supremes along with Jean Terrell and Scherrie Payne but left to pursue a solo career in singing. Once again, she was replaced by Lynda Laurence in the group. 

In 1987, Birdsong returned to singing, and released the single "Dancing Room" on Hi-Hat Records. Other songs were demoed, but none released. These songs included "Ready For You", "Check It Out", "Talk is Cheap", and "Anatomy". During this time, Cindy made several high-profile appearances, performing at the Hippodrome, London, where she had performed several years earlier as a Supreme at "London's Talk of the Town". Former singing partner Diana Ross was in attendance for this performance. She also sang a medley of Supremes hits and her new single on a television talk show hosted by Regis Philbin and his wife Joy. 

In 1999, she reunited with The Bluebells, who changed their name to Labelle after Birdsong's departure, for the first time in thirty-two years as the group accepted an R&B Foundation Award for Lifetime Achievement, singing "You'll Never Walk Alone" together. 

In 2004, Birdsong joined Mary Wilson and Kelly Rowland (of Destiny's Child) to perform a medley of Supreme hits for the Motown 45 anniversary television special. 

Cindy currently resides in the Los Angeles area.

Personal life
Birdsong married Charles Hewlett in August 1970 in San Francisco. In attendance were then singing partners Jean Terrell and Mary Wilson. This was Birdsong's first marriage and Hewlett's second. Birdsong filed for divorce in March 1975, citing "irreconcilable differences". The couple have one son, David, born in 1972.

Birdsong is currently suffering from Alzheimer's disease.

Kidnapping
On December 2, 1969, Birdsong was kidnapped while returning to her apartment with her then-boyfriend (later husband) Charles Hewlett and their friend, Howard Meek. The intruder, wielding a knife, forced Birdsong to tie up the two, then forced her downstairs into her car. Birdsong managed to unlock the car door and jump out of the vehicle onto the highway to safety. Four days later, on December 6, 1969, Charles Collier, a maintenance man at Birdsong's apartment, contacted police and turned himself in.

In popular culture

In the 1980s, Cindy appeared on the PTL Network and was interviewed by Tammy Faye Bakker. Cindy "testified", then later in the program, sang a spiritual hymn.  

In a 1989 episode of Designing Women entitled "The Wilderness Experience", the character of Anthony (played by actor Meshach Taylor) poses as "Cindy Birdsong".

Discography

Patti LaBelle & The Bluebells

Albums
1963: Sweethearts of the Apollo
1963: Sleigh Bells, Jingle Bells & Bluebells
1965: On Stage
1966: Over the Rainbow
1967: Dreamer

Singles
1962: "I Sold My Heart to the Junkman"
1962: "I Found a New Love"
1962: "Tear After Tear"
1963: "Cool Water"
1963: "Decatur Street"
1963: "Down the Aisle (The Wedding Song)"
1964: "You'll Never Walk Alone"
1964: "One Phone Call (Will Do)"
1964: "Danny Boy"
1965: "All or Nothing"
1966: "Over the Rainbow"
1966: "Ebb Tide"
1966: "I'm Still Waiting"
1966: "Take Me for a Little While"
1967: "Always Something There to Remind Me"
1967: "Dreamer"
1967: "Oh My Love"

Diana Ross & The Supremes

Albums
1968: Reflections
1968: Live at London's Talk of the Town
1968: Diana Ross & The Supremes Sing and Perform "Funny Girl"
1968: Diana Ross & The Supremes Join The Temptations (w/ The Temptations)
1968: Love Child
1968: TCB (w/ The Temptations)
1969: Let the Sunshine In
1969: Together (w/ The Temptations)
1969: Cream of the Crop
1969: G.I.T. on Broadway (w/ The Temptations)
1970: Farewell

Singles
(All singles with The Temptations)
1968: "I'm Gonna Make You Love Me"
1969: "I'll Try Something New"
1969: "The Weight"
1969: "I Second That Emotion"
1970: "Why (Must We Fall in Love)"

The Supremes

Albums
1970: Right On
1970: The Magnificent 7 (w/ The Four Tops)
1970: New Ways but Love Stays
1971: The Return of the Magnificent Seven (w/ the Four Tops)
1971: Touch
1971: Dynamite (w/ The Four Tops)
1972: Floy Joy
1975: The Supremes
1976: High Energy

Singles
1970: "Up the Ladder to the Roof"
1970: "Everybody's Got the Right to Love"
1970: "Stoned Love"
1970: "River Deep – Mountain High" (w/ The Four Tops)
1971: "Nathan Jones"
1971: "You Gotta Have Love in Your Heart" (w/ The Four Tops)
1971: "Touch"
1971: "Floy Joy"
1972: "Automatically Sunshine"
1972: "Without the One You Love" (w/ The Four Tops)
1972: "Your Wonderful, Sweet Sweet Love"
1975: "He's My Man"
1975: "Where Do I Go from Here"
1975: "Early Morning Love"
1976: "I'm Gonna Let My Heart Do the Walking"
1976: "High Energy"

Solo

Singles
1987: "Dancing Room"

References

External links

1939 births
Living people
African-American women singers
American nurses
American women nurses
Musicians from Camden, New Jersey
People from Mount Holly, New Jersey
Camden High School (New Jersey) alumni
The Supremes members
Labelle members
Musicians from Philadelphia
Singers from New Jersey
Motown artists
Singers from Pennsylvania
20th-century American singers
20th-century American women singers
African-American nurses